Al-Salam Sports Club is an Omani sports club based in Sohar, Oman. The club is currently playing in the Oman Second Division League, second division of Oman Football Association.

Being a multisport club
Although being mainly known for their football, Al-Salam SC like many other clubs in Oman, have not only football in their list, but also hockey, volleyball, handball, basketball, badminton and squash. They also have a youth football team competing in the Omani Youth league.

References

External links
Al Salam at futbol24.com
Club Info at Goalzz.com

Football clubs in Oman
Omani League
Sohar